Élie Berger (1850 in Beaucourt – 1925 in Paris) was a French palaeographer and archivist.

Graduated an archivist and palaeographer of the École Nationale des Chartes in 1876, Élie Berger was first a member of the École française de Rome from 1876 to 1880, then a custodian at the Archives nationales of France from 1880 to 1897, when he was elected to the Chair of palaeography of the École des Chartes. A Docteur ès lettres in 1895, he was elected a member of the Académie des Inscriptions et Belles-Lettres in 1905.

References

External links 
 Berger on data.bnf.fr 
 Obituary by H.-François Delaborde on Persée
 Obituary by Charles-Victor Langlois on Persée

1850 births
1925 deaths
French palaeographers
French archivists
Members of the Académie des Inscriptions et Belles-Lettres
École Nationale des Chartes alumni